Valery Kobzarenko (born 5 February 1977 in Kiev, Ukraine) is a Ukrainian former professional track and road bicycle racer.

Major results

1996
 1st Tour de Ribas
1997
 2nd Tour de Ribas
1998
 7th Overall Okolo Slovenska
1999
 6th Overall Tour de Luxembourg
2000
 3rd Road race, National Road Championships
2003
 3rd Overall Paths of King Nikola
 6th Overall Ringerike GP
 7th Overall Tour of Hellas
 7th GP Capodarco
 9th Gran Premio San Giuseppe
2006
 1st  Overall Tour de Beauce
1st Stage 1
 6th Hel van het Mergelland
 7th Philadelphia International Championship
2007
 7th Overall Tour of Missouri
 8th Overall Tour of Ireland
 10th U.S. Cycling Open
2008
 4th Overall Tour de Beauce
 9th Univest Grand Prix
2010
 2nd Overall Tour du Maroc
 5th Overall Tour de Beauce
2013
 1st Prologue Romanian Cycling Tour

References

External links

Ukrainian male cyclists
1977 births
Living people
Sportspeople from Kyiv